Bahar Davary is an Iranian-American theologian and religious studies scholar and Professor of Theology and Religious Studies at the University of San Diego. She is known for her works on comparative study of religion and Islamic studies.

Career
Davary's interests are broadly within the field of Comparative Religion focusing on Islamic studies. Davary's first monograph Women and the Qur'an: A Study in Islamic Hermeneutics (Lewiston, New York: Edwin Mellen Press, 2009), which was awarded the Adèle Mellen Prize, examines development, continuity, and change in representing women with a focus on dynamic identities of the texts. Davary's later writings focuses on the development of Islamic feminist knowledge, especially as it involves with the questions of Orientalism, colonialism and Islamic patriarchy. She has published several papers in academic journals and encyclopedias and has presented more than 100 lectures locally, nationally, and internationally. Since 2005, She has been a faculty member of USD.

References

External links
Bahar Davary at the University of San Diego

Iranologists
Living people
Iranian theologians
American theologians
University of Tehran alumni
Catholic University of America alumni
University of San Diego faculty
Religious studies scholars
American anti-racism activists
Iranian anti-racism activists
Year of birth missing (living people)
Women scholars of Islam
Proponents of Islamic feminism